This is a list of Scottish football transfers featuring at least one 2014–15 Scottish Premiership club or one 2014–15 Scottish Championship club which were completed after the end of the summer 2014 transfer window and before the end of the 2014–15 season.

September 2014 – May 2015

See also
 List of Scottish football transfers summer 2014
 List of Scottish football transfers summer 2015

References

Transfers
Scottish
2014 in Scottish sport
2015 in Scottish sport
2014 winter